Mis Planes Son Amarte (English: My Plans Are to Love You) is the seventh studio album by Colombian recording artist Juanes.

The album won Latin Grammy Award for Best Pop/Rock Album at the 18th Annual Latin Grammy Awards. It was released as a visual album, with an accompanying film released as a music video for every track on YouTube. The album tells the story of "a Colombian astronaut who time travels to find true and eternal love." It also features Juanes's first song in English, "Goodbye for Now".

Reception
In a 5-star review, AllMusic praised the album and wrote that it "not only breaks ground on every aesthetic frontier, but results in the finest outing in Juanes' career to date." RollingStone gave the album 4 stars, writing "Juanes shows how it's possible to touch the stars with your feet planted firmly on the earth."

Track listing

Charts

Weekly charts

Year-end charts

Certifications

References

2017 albums
Albums produced by Sky Rompiendo
Juanes albums
Spanish-language albums
Universal Music Latino albums